Gli ultimi giorni di Pompei (1926) is an Italian historical silent drama film. The film was directed by Carmine Gallone and Amleto Palermi based on the 1834 novel The Last Days of Pompeii by Edward Bulwer-Lytton. Original release prints of the film were entirely colorized by the Pathechrome stencil color process.

Plot summary

Cast
 Victor Varconi as Glauco 
 Rina De Liguoro as Ione 
 María Corda as Nydia, the blind flower seller
 Bernhard Goetzke as Arbace 
 Emilio Ghione as Caleno 
 Lia Maris as Julia 
 Gildo Bocci as Diomede 
 Enrica Fantis as Julia's friend 
 Vittorio Evangelisti as Apecide 
 Ferruccio Biancini as Olinto 
 Carlo Gualandri as Clodio 
 Vasco Creti as Sallustius 
 Alfredo Martinelli as Lepidus 
 Giuseppe Pierozzi as Josio 
 Enrico Monti as Lidone
 Enrico Palermi as Medone 
 Carlo Reiter as Pansa 
 Carlo Duse as Burbo

See also
 List of early color feature films

References

External links
 
 Frame of film at Widescreen Museum

1926 films
1920s color films
Italian disaster films
Italian historical drama films
Italian silent feature films
Italian black-and-white films
Pompeii in popular culture
Films based on The Last Days of Pompeii
Films directed by Carmine Gallone
Films directed by Amleto Palermi
1920s historical drama films
Films about volcanoes
1920s disaster films
1926 drama films
Silent historical drama films
1920s Italian films